PERRIN PARIS is a French leather accessories brand with shops in Paris, New York City, Los Angeles, Tokyo and Hong Kong.

History

PERRIN PARIS was founded in Saint-Junien, France.

In 2009 Perrin Paris opened a boutique in Beverly Hills, followed by the New York City location on Madison Avenue at the historic Carlyle Hotel. The Paris flagship, located steps away from Place Vendôme, and the Hong Kong shop at the luxurious IFC Mall opened in 2015. Perrin also inaugurated its first shop in Japan in Tokyo G6 Mall.

The house's design studio and showroom is based in the 1st arrondissement of Paris, France.

References

Retail companies established in 1893
French brands